Kahun may refer to:
Kahun, India, Marathi word meaning = "Why"
El-Lahun, Egypt
Kahun, Nepal
Kahan, Pakistan